Arthur A. Ross (February 4, 1920 - November 11, 2008) was an American film and television screenwriter, best known for writing the Oscar-nominated script for Brubaker and for co-writing Creature from the Black Lagoon with Harry Essex. He served in the United States Army during World War II and was blacklisted in Hollywood during the Red Scare.  His son is writer, producer, and director Gary Ross. His daughter is constitutional and Indigenous rights lawyer, Stephanie Ross.

Partial filmography
 Brubaker (1980)
 Satan's School for Girls (1973)
 The Great Race (1965)
 The Three Worlds of Gulliver (1960)
 Creature from the Black Lagoon (1954)
 Kazan (1949)
 Rusty Leads the Way (1948)
 San Quentin (1946)

References

External links

1920 births
2008 deaths
American television writers
American male screenwriters
American male television writers
20th-century American male writers
20th-century American screenwriters
United States Army personnel of World War II